Shan Jun (born 7 August 1994 in Luliang, Yunnan) is a Chinese male Lightweight boxer. He won the bronze medalist at Olympic Qualifying Tournament in June 2016 in Baku, Azerbaijan, qualifying for the Rio 2016 Olympics.

Career 
Born in Xiaobaihu town (小白户镇), Luliang county, Yunnan province, When Shan was a preteen, his brother and he went to Qujing Sports School, he practised boxing and his brother did sprint running there. At his age of 15, he won the champion in a teenagers boxing match held by Kunming Sports Federation in 2009, soon afterwards he was a member of Yunnan provincial boxing Team. Although his boxing skills were so-so in the early days after being a member there, he got more and more excellent than the other exercisers because of his hard working to practise boxing. he won the 3rd in the National youth competition, 
It was that he firstly took part in national events, in the next year he won the gold medal in the National youth competition.

References

External links 
 
 
 
 

1994 births
Living people
People from Qujing
Sportspeople from Yunnan
Chinese male boxers
Lightweight boxers
Olympic boxers of China
Boxers at the 2016 Summer Olympics
Boxers at the 2018 Asian Games
Asian Games bronze medalists for China
Asian Games medalists in boxing
Medalists at the 2018 Asian Games